Statistics of the Swiss Super League for the 2007–08 football season.
Statistics of the Swiss Challenge League for the 2007–08 football season.
Statistics of the Swiss 1. Liga for the 2007–08 football season.
Statistics of the 2. Liga Interregional for the 2007–08 football season.

Super League

Challenge League

1. Liga

Group 1

Group 2

Group 3

Play-off to Challenge League

1st round

Final round

Relegation play-off

References
 Worldfootball.net